The Saudi Tour, formerly known as the Tour of Saudi Arabia, is an annual professional road bicycle racing stage race first held in Saudi Arabia in 1999. It has been held intermittently since its creation, and in 2020 joined the UCI Asia Tour for the first time. It is promoted by the Amaury Sport Organisation (ASO) and is classified by the International Cycling Union (UCI) as a 2.1 category race.

Winners

References

Cycle racing in Asia
UCI Asia Tour races
Recurring sporting events established in 1999
1999 establishments in Saudi Arabia
Saudi Tour